Brendon Oxenham (born 12 September 1971) is a New Zealand former cricketer. He played fourteen first-class and five List A matches for Auckland and Northern Districts between 1990 and 1994.

See also
 List of Auckland representative cricketers

References

External links
 

1971 births
Living people
New Zealand cricketers
Auckland cricketers
Northern Districts cricketers
Cricketers from Hamilton, New Zealand